Valeriu Andronic (born 21 December 1982) is a Moldovan football manager and a former player.

Career
Andronic started his career at capital club before cross border to join FC Dinamo București. In summer 2002, he joined MTK Hungária FC on a two-year contract. In August 2003, he moved to Dynamo Moscow on loan.

After he was released by MTK Hungária, he played for Tiligul Tiraspol and FC Metalist Kharkiv in 2004–05 season, before moved to Russian First Division side FC Oryol. He played in the Gambrinus liga in the Czech Republic for Bohemians in 2009.

International career
As age of 18, he was the member of 2002 FIFA World Cup qualification (UEFA) and played three times in the campaign. He was recalled in friendly match on 6 February 2008.

International goals
Scores and results list Moldova's goal tally first.

Personal life
Valeriu is cousin with Igor Andronic, and also to brothers Oleg and Gheorghe Andronic, all of them being Moldova international footballers.

He is married to Angela, and they have two sons, David and Marc, and a daughter, Sabina.

His son David is a professional footballer, and they have played at a professional level against each other in the match Milsami Orhei 0–1 Speranța Nisporeni, on 1 November 2015. This was also the first match in the Divizia Națională of Moldova when a father and his son have played against each other.

Valeriu Andronic is the son of Eugenia and Mihai Andronic (born 4 January 1959). His father in his youth was a footballer, and currently is a football coach for children, coaching the junior section of CSCT Buiucani. One uncle, the father of Igor, also was a footballer in his youth.

References

External links
 
 
 

1982 births
Living people
Footballers from Chișinău
Moldovan footballers
Moldovan expatriate footballers
Moldova international footballers
Association football midfielders
Expatriate footballers in Bahrain
Expatriate footballers in Russia
Expatriate footballers in Hungary
Expatriate footballers in Romania
Expatriate footballers in Ukraine
Moldovan expatriate sportspeople in Ukraine
Expatriate footballers in the Czech Republic
Expatriate footballers in Tajikistan
Liga I players
FC Progresul București players
CS Inter Gaz București players
FC Dinamo București players
FC Dynamo Moscow reserves players
MTK Budapest FC players
FC Metalist Kharkiv players
FC Baltika Kaliningrad players
FCM Câmpina players
Czech First League players
FK Bohemians Prague (Střížkov) players
FC Astana players
Ukrainian Premier League players
FC SKA-Khabarovsk players
FC Oryol players
FC Zimbru Chișinău players
FC Veris Chișinău players
Moldovan football managers
Malkiya Club players
CS Petrocub Hîncești players
Tajikistan Higher League players
Moldovan Super Liga players
Moldovan Super Liga managers